Two Little Wooden Shoes is a 1920 British silent romance film directed by Sidney Morgan and starring Joan Morgan, Langhorn Burton and J. Denton-Thompson.

Premise
An orphan walks to Paris to visit a sick artist, but discovers him living a dissolute lifestyle.

Cast
 Joan Morgan as Dedee  
 Langhorn Burton as Victor Flamen  
 J. Denton-Thompson as Jeannot  
 Constance Backner as Liza  
 Faith Bevan as The Model  
 Ronald Power as The Master  
 Maud Cressall as Mme. Vallier

References

Bibliography
 Low, Rachael. The History of the British Film 1918–1929. George Allen & Unwin, 1971.

External links
 

1920 films
British romantic drama films
British silent feature films
Films directed by Sidney Morgan
1920 romantic drama films
Films based on works by Ouida
Films set in France
British black-and-white films
1920s English-language films
1920s British films
Silent romantic drama films